Good to Go-Go is the 29th album by Spyro Gyra, released on June 12, 2007. This album has the first appearance by the drummer Bonny Bonaparte.

Good to Go-Go peaked at No. 9 on the jazz album chart at Billboard magazine. Many songs on the album have been used on The Weather Channel's Local on the 8s segments.

Track list
 "Simple Pleasures" (Jay Beckenstein) – 5:50
 "Get Busy" (Tom Schuman) – 5:19
 "Jam Up" (Bonny Bonaparte) – 4:15
 "The Left Bank" (Beckenstein) – 5:40
 "Funkyard Dog" (Julio Fernandez) – 5:02
 "Along for the Ride" (Fernandez) – 6:45
 "Island Time" (Scott Ambush) – 6:23
 "Wassup!" (Schuman) – 4:45
 "Easy Street" (Beckenstein) – 5:02
 "A Winter Tale" (Beckenstein) – 6:34
 "Good to Go-Go" (Ambush) – 6:41
 "Newroses" (Beckenstein, Fernandez) – 6:46

Musicians 

Spyro Gyra
 Jay Beckenstein – saxophones
 Tom Schuman – keyboards
 Julio Fernández – guitars
 Scott Ambush – bass guitar
 Bonny B – drums, percussion, vocals

Additional musicians
 Andy Narell – steel drums (3, 7)
 Marc Quiñones – congas (4, 7, 9, 11)
 Christian Howes – violin (4)

Production 
 Spyro Gyra – producers
 Dave Love – executive producer
 Eric Carlinsky – engineer 
 Martin Walters – mixing 
 Greg Calbi – mastering 
 Robert Hoffman – art direction, design 
 Paul Greco – photography

Studios
 Mixed at Big Time Audio (Jonesborough, Tennessee).
 Mastered at Sterling Sound (New York City, New York).

References

2007 albums
Spyro Gyra albums
Heads Up International albums